Hypnoidus is a genus of beetles belonging to the family Elateridae.

The species of this genus are found in Eurasia and Northern America.

Species:
 Hypnoidus abbreviatus (Say, 1823)
 Hypnoidus riparius (Fabricius, 1792)

References

Elateridae
Elateridae genera